Recombinant human parathyroid hormone, sold under the brand names Preotact and Natpara, is an artificially manufactured form of the parathyroid hormone used to treat hypoparathyroidism. Recombinant human parathyroid hormone is used in the treatment of osteoporosis in postmenopausal women at high risk of osteoporotic fractures. A significant reduction in the incidence of vertebral fractures has been demonstrated.

The most common side effects include sensations of tingling, tickling, pricking, or burning of the skin (paraesthesia); low blood calcium; headache; high blood calcium; and nausea.

Medical uses 
Natpara is indicated as an adjunct to calcium and vitamin D to control hypocalcemia in people with hypoparathyroidism.

Preotact was approved by the European Medicines Agency for the treatment of osteoporosis in postmenopausal women at high risk of fractures, but the marketing authorisation has been withdrawn at the manufacturer's request.

Administration 

The recommended dose is 100 micrograms of Preotact administered once-daily as a subcutaneous injection into the abdomen, during 18 months (data support treatment up to 24 months).  The injections are given using a specially designed injection device (Preotact(TM)Pen).  The PreotactPen is specifically designed to allow osteoporosis patients to administer the injections, despite challenges of vision impairment and limited strength of hands and digits tributable to high age.  Patients should receive supplemental calcium and vitamin D during treatment with parathyroid hormone.
Following treatment with Preotact, patients can be treated with a bisphosphonate to further increase bone mineral density

Contraindications for use 

Parathyroid hormone treatment should not be initiated in patients:
 with hypersensitivity to PTH or excipients
 who have received radiation therapy to the skeleton
 with pre-existing hypercalcemia and other disturbances in the metabolism of phosphate or calcium
 with metabolic bone diseases other than primary osteoporosis (including hyperparathyroidism and Paget's disease
 with unexplained elevations of bone-specific alkaline phosphatase
 with severe chronic kidney disease
 with severe liver impairment

Interactions 

Parathyroid hormone is a natural peptide that is not metabolised in the liver.  It is not protein bound and has a low volume of distribution, therefore no specific drug-drug interactions are suspected.  From the knowledge of the mechanism of action, combined use of Preotact and cardiac glycosides may predispose patients to digitalis toxicity if hypercalcemia develops.

Undesirable effects

Hypercalcemia and/or hypercalciuria reflect the known pharmacodynamic actions of parathyroid hormone in the gastrointestinal tract, the kidney and the skeleton, and is therefore an expected undesirable effect. Nausea is another commonly reported adverse reaction to the use of parathyroid hormone.

Pharmacodynamic properties

Mechanism of action

Preotact contains recombinant human parathyroid hormone which is identical to the full-length native 84-amino acid polypeptide.
Physiological actions of parathyroid hormone include stimulation of bone formation by direct effects on bone forming cells (osteoblasts) indirectly increasing the intestinal absorption of calcium and increasing the tubular reabsorption of calcium and excretion of phosphate by the kidney.

Pharmacodynamic effects

The skeletal effects of parathyroid hormone depend upon the pattern of systemic exposure. Transient elevations in parathyroid hormone levels after subcutaneous injection of Preotact stimulates new bone formation on trabecular and cortical bone surfaces by preferential stimulation of osteoblastic activity over osteoclastic activity.

Effects on serum calcium concentrations

Parathyroid hormone is the principal regulator of serum calcium hemostasis. In response to subcutaneous doses of Preotact (100 micrograms), serum total calcium levels increase gradually and reach peak concentration at approximately 6 to 8 hours after dosing. In general, serum calcium levels return to normal within 24 hours.

Clinical efficacy

In an 18-month double-blind, placebo controlled study, the effects of Preotact on the fracture incidence in 2532 women with postmenopausal osteoporosis was studied. Approximately 19% of patients had a prevalent vertebral fracture at baseline and the mean lumbar T-score of -3.0 in both active and placebo arm.
Compared to the placebo group, there was a 61% relative risk reduction of a new vertebral fracture at month 18 for the women in the Preotact group.
To prevent one or more new vertebral fractures, 48 women had to be treated for a median of 18 months for the total population. For patients who were already fractured, the number needed to treat was 21.

Effect on bone mineral density 

In the same study mentioned above, Preotact increased bone mineral density in the lumbar spine after 18 months treatment by 6.5% compared with a reduction by 0.3% in the placebo group. The difference was statistically significant. The increase of bone mineral density in the hip was also statistically significant compared to placebo, but only around 1.0% at study endpoint. Continued treatment up to 24 months lead to a continued increase in bone mineral density.

Pharmacokinetics

Absorption

Subcutaneous administration of parathyroid hormone into the abdomen produces a rapid increase in plasma parathyroid hormone levels which reach peak at 1 to 2 hours after dosing. The mean half-life is approximately 1.5 hours. The absolute bioavailability of 100 micrograms of Preotact after subcutaneous administration in the abdomen is 55%.

Distribution

The volume of distribution at steady-state following intravenous administration is approximately 5.4 liters. Intersubject variability is about 40%.

Biotransformation

Parathyroid hormone is efficiently removed from the blood by a receptor-mediated process in the liver and is broken down into smaller peptide fragments. The fragments derived from the amino-terminus are further degraded within the cell while the fragments derived from the carboxy-terminus are released back into the blood and cleared by the kidney. These carboxy-terminal fragments are thought to play a role in the regulation of parathyroid hormone activity. Under normal physiological conditions full-length parathyroid hormone H constitutes only 5-30% of the circulating forms of the molecule, while 70-95% is present as carboxy-terminal fragments. Following administration of Preotact, carboxy-terminal fragments make up about 60-90% of the circulating forms of the molecule. Intersubject variability in systemic clearance is about 15%.

Elimination

Parathyroid hormone is metabolised in the liver and to a lesser extent in the kidney. It is not excreted from the body in its intact form. Circulating carboxy-terminal fragments are filtered by the kidney, but are subsequently broken down into even smaller fragments during tubular reuptake. No studies have so far been performed in patients with severe hepatic impairment. The pharmacokinetics of parathyroid hormone in patients with severe chronic kidney disease (creatinine clearance of less than 30 ml/min) has not been investigated either.

Pharmaceutical particulars

Preotact is delivered in a two chamber, glass ampoule. One chamber contains the active substance in the form of a white powder (with excipients: mannitol, citric acid monohydrate, NaCl, NaOH, HCl). And the other contains the solvent; water for injection. The powder is mixed with the solvent when the ampoule is inserted into the injection device.

Storage and shelf-life

The mixed solution is stable for 28 days when stored between 2 and 8 °C. During this 28-day period the mixed solution may be stored for up to 7 days at room temperature, allowing the patient the freedom to travel. Unmixed ampoules have a shelf-life of 30 months. The products should not be frozen and should be protected from light.

See also
 Teriparatide, another parathyroid hormone

References

External links 
 

Hormones of calcium metabolism
Parathyroid hormone receptor agonists
Takeda Pharmaceutical Company brands
Drugs acting on the musculoskeletal system
Receptor agonists
Withdrawn drugs
Orphan drugs